The following is a chronological list of Sri Lankan activists.



A
 Sunila Abeysekera
 Caroline Anthonypillai
 A. T. Ariyaratne

B
 Mary Bastian
 Mark Anthony Bracegirdle
 Thiruchelvam Nihal Jim Brown

C
 Radhika Coomaraswamy
 Charles Edgar Corea

D
 Sampath Lakmal de Silva
 Colvin R. de Silva
 William de Silva
 P. Devakumaran
 A. P. de Zoysa
 Richard de Zoysa
 Francis de Zoysa
 Arthur V. Dias

F
 Chandra Fernando
 Nimalka Fernando
 Basil Fernando
 Frank Marcus Fernando
 Gratien Fernando
 Rosanna Flamer-Caldera

G
 Vivienne Goonewardena
 Philip Gunawardena

H
 Rajan Hoole
 Ratnajeevan Hoole
 Walisinghe Harischandra
 Charles Alwis Hewavitharana
 Edmund Hewavitarne
 Don Carolis Hewavitharana

I
 Indrani Iriyagolla

J
 Dandeniya Gamage Jayanthi
 Kumari Jayawardena
 George Jeyarajasingham

K
 Suresh Kumar and Ranjith Kumar incident

L
 Kethesh Loganathan

M
 Arunachalam Mahadeva
 T. Maheswaran
 Viraj Mendis

N
 Ariyanayagam Chandra Nehru

P
 Nicholas Pillai Pakiaranjith
 Tikiri Bandara Panabokke
 Ven Kirantidiye Pannasekera
 Joseph Pararajasingham
 Daya Pathirana
 Ajith C. S. Perera
 Kumar Ponnambalam

R
 Nadarajah Raviraj

S
 Sinnathamby Sivamaharajah
 K. Sivanesan
 Taraki Sivaram
 Kopalasingham Sritharan
 Subramaniyam Sugirdharajan
 Chandrabose Suthaharan

T
 Rajini Thiranagama
 Chelvy Thiyagarajah
 Neelan Tiruchelvam

V
 Maheswary Velautham
 Samantha Vithanage
 Lasantha Wickrematunge
 Edwin Wijeyeratne
 S. VIVEKANANTAHARAJAH -Raju

See also
 Sri Lankan independence activist

 
Activists
Sri Lankan